Orthogonal Signal Correction (OSC) is a spectral preprocessing technique that removes variation from a data matrix X that is orthogonal to the response matrix Y. OSC was introduced by researchers at the University of Umea in 1998 and has since found  applications in domains including metabolomics.

References 

Signal processing